The Communist Party of Malaya/Marxist–Leninist was a splinter group of the Communist Party of Malaya. The CPM/ML was formed in August 1974. It conducted armed struggle against the Malaysian government, with bases in southern Thailand. The CPM/ML had a radio broadcast, called Suara Seorang Malaysia (Voice of a Malaysian).

In 1983 the CPM/ML merged with the Communist Party of Malaya/Revolutionary Faction and founded the Malaysian Communist Party.

References

Communist parties in Malaysia
Defunct political parties in Malaysia
Political schisms
1970 establishments in Malaysia
Political parties established in 1970
Defunct communist parties
Defunct communist militant groups